The striped Caribbean gecko (Aristelliger barbouri), also known commonly as the Inagua croaking gecko and the Inagua gecko, is a species of lizard in the family Sphaerodactylidae. The species is endemic to the Bahamas.

Etymology
The specific name, barbouri, is in honor of American herpetologist Thomas Barbour.

Geographic Range
A. barbouri is found on Great Inagua Island including Sheep Cay, Inagua District, the Bahamas.

Habitat
The preferred natural habitat of A. barbouri is shrubland.

Description
Its tail is more darkly colored than its head and body.

Reproduction
A. barbouri is oviparous.

References

Further reading
Bauer AM, Russell AP (1993). "Aristelliger barbouri ". Catalogue of American Amphibians and Reptiles (566): 1.
Noble GK, Klingel GC (1932). "The Reptiles of Great Inagua Island, British West Indies". American Museum Novitates (549): 1-25. (Aristelligella barbouri, new species, pp. 4–11, Figures 1–5).
Rösler H (2000). "Kommentierte Liste der rezent, subrezent und fossil bekannten Geckotaxa (Reptilia: Gekkonomorpha)". Gekkota 2: 28–153. (Aristelliger barbouri, p. 60). (in German).
Schwartz A, Henderson RW (1991). Amphibians and Reptiles of the West Indies: Descriptions, Distributions, and Natural History. Gainesville: University of Florida Press. 720 pp. . (Aristelliger barbouri, p. 358).

Aristelliger
Reptiles described in 1932
Reptiles of the Bahamas
Endemic fauna of the Bahamas